Zlín Zoo (Zoologická zahrada Zlín) is a zoological garden in Zlín in the Zlín Region of the Czech Republic. It is located by the Lešná Castle, situated about 10 km from the centre of the city. It is the second most-visited zoo in the country, and as of 2020, it was overall the fifth most visited tourist destination in the country.

History
The zoo was founded between years 1804 and 1805. After the World War II, it was nationalized and opened to the public in 1948.

Botanical garden
In the area, there is also a botanical garden with 13,000 kinds of plants. The newest exhibition hall, opened in 2007, displays 250 rare plant species from tropical Yucatán.

Lešná Castle
Within the area of the zoo, there is also the Lešná Castle, built by the architects Johann Mick and Viktor Siedek in 1887–1893. It is a historical mansion which contains collections of paintings, porcelain and trophies from the late 19th century.

References

External links

Turistický a informační portál města Zlína

Zoos in the Czech Republic
Buildings and structures in Zlín
Zoos established in 1948
1948 establishments in Czechoslovakia
20th-century architecture in the Czech Republic